Henry Hopetoun Harrison (1 January 1901 – 7 March 1972) was an Australian rules footballer who played with Essendon and Footscray in the Victorian Football League (VFL).

Family
The son of John Harrison (1852-1909), and Margaret Harrison (1864-1927), née Finlayson, Henry Hopetoun Harrison was born at Walhalla, Victoria on 1 January 1901.

He married Gladys Roseman (1902-1968) in 1927.

His brother, Joseph Ernest "Joe" Harrison (1903–1977) also played VFL football with Essendon.

Football

Esendon (VFL)
He was playing for Essendon "Juniors" (i.e. the Second XVIII) in 1922, including the competition's Grand Final, in 1923, and in 1924.

He played in three First XVII matches for Essendon in 1923.

Footscray (VFL)
On 29 April 1925 he was cleared from Essendon to play with Footscray in its first VFL season.

Camberwell (VFA)
Cleared from Footscray on 28 April 1926, he played in 16 games with Camberwell First XVIII in the VFA in 1926, and one game in 1927.

Military service
He served in the RAAF during World War II; he enlisted on 7 August 1940, and was discharged on 3 December1945.

Death
He died at the Repatriation General Hospital Heidelberg on 7 March 1972.

Notes

References
 
 Maplestone, M., Flying Higher: History of the Essendon Football Club 1872–1996, Essendon Football Club, (Melbourne), 1996. 
 World War Two Nominal Roll: Sergeant Henry Hopetoun Harrison (11779), Department of Veterans' Affairs.
 A13859, 11779: World War Two Service Record: Sergeant Henry Hopetoun Harrison (11779), (documents not yet examined for release), National Archives of Australia.

External links 
 
 
 Harry Harrison, at The VFA Project.

1901 births
1972 deaths
Australian rules footballers from Victoria (Australia)
Essendon Football Club players
Western Bulldogs players
Camberwell Football Club players
Royal Australian Air Force personnel of World War II
Military personnel from Victoria (Australia)